Genicanthus lamarck, the blackstriped angelfish or Lamarck's angelfish, is a species of marine ray-finned fish, a marine angelfish belonging to  the family Pomacanthidae. It occurs in the Indo-West Pacific region.

Description
Genicanthus lamarck adults are pale greyish to whitish in colour marked with 4-5 irregular black undulating stripes which radiate out from the eye and run horizontally along the flanks. There is a wide black submarginal band on the dorsal fin, and the caudal fin is finely spotted. The topmost stripe is wider in the females and in the juveniles. The males have a yellow patch on the crown, black pelvic fins, and very elongated lobes on the  caudal fin. In addition the males have black pelvic fins and white lobes to the caudal fin while females have white pectoral fins and black caudal fin lobes. The dorsal fin contains 15 spines and 15-16 soft rays while the anal fin has 3 spines and 16-17soft rays.

Distribution
Genicanthus lamarck is found from the Gulf of Thailand east through the Malayan Archipelago to the Solomon Islands, north as far as southern Japan and south to the Great Barrier Reef. Its Australian distribution also includes Ashmore Reef and Cartier Island in the Timor Sea.

Habitat and biology
It is found in areas of dense coral growth on the seaward slopes of reefs and on steep drop-offs. Its normal diet is zooplankton. They are normally observed over the bottom in small harems with a dominant male and 2-6 females. They are sequential protogynous hermaphrodites and if the male in a harem goes missing the dominant female changes sex to become male.

Systematics 
Genicanthus lamarck was first formally described in 1860 as Holocanthus caudovittatus by the French naturalist Bernard Germain de Lacépède (1756-1825) with no type locality given. The specific name honours the French naturalist Jean-Baptiste Pierre Antoine de Monet, Chevalier de Lamarck (1744-1829). This species is known to hybridise with the ornate angelfish (Genicanthus bellus).

Utilisation
Genicanthus lamarck is frequently found in the aquarium trade. It is also regarded as a delicacy in the Moluccas.

References

External links
 

lamarck
Fish described in 1802
Jean-Baptiste Lamarck